Etisalat Award for Arabic Children’s Literature is an Arabic literary award for children's literature. It was established in 2009 by the Arab Children's Book Publisher’s Forum. It is sponsored by Her Excellency Sheikha Bodour bint Sultan Al Qasimi, President of UAEBBY (United Arab Emirates Board on Books for Young People). Organization of the prize was handed over to UAEBBY in 2010. The award is announced each year during the Sharjah International Book Fair.

Entry is open to books that meet these criteria: the book must be written in Arabic; must be original (not translated, quoted or reproduced); and must have been published within the past three years. The book may not have received any previous local, regional or international awards, and the content must not violate the values, traditions and customs of Arab communities. Entry is open to children's books that target the age group from 0 to 14 years, and each publishing house is entitled to nominate a maximum of three titles.

From 2009-2012, it was one of the richest literary prizes in the world for a single winner.

Starting in 2013, the award was significantly restructured with new categories and a splitting of the 1,000,000 AED award as follows. 
Best Text 100,000 AED
Best Illustration 100,000 AED
Best Production 100,000 AED
Best Children's Book of the Year 300,000 AED (split between author, illustrator and publisher)
Best Young Adult Book of the Year 200,000 AED (split between author and publisher)
Etisalat Award Workshops for Children’s Books 200,000 AED

Winners

2009-2013 (winner received 1,000,000 AED)

2013
Best Children's Book of the Year: Rod of Racemes by Egypt-based Nahdet Misr Publishing House, authored by Afaf Tobala and illustrated by Hanadi Sleet
Best Young Adult Book of the Year: Ajwan by Egypt-based Nahdet Misr Publishing House, authored by Emirati writer Noura al Noman
Best Text: My Mum Jadida by UAE writer Mariam Suhail Al Rashedi
Best Illustration: Rod of Racemes by illustrator Hanadi Sleet
Best Production: When You Get Angry by Lebanon-based Asala Publishing House

2014
Best Children's Book of the Year: Naughty Kitty by Abeer Ibrahim Taher and illustrated by Maya Fidawi
Best Young Adult Book of the Year: Extraordinary Journeys to Unknown Places by Sonia Nimr and illustrated by Lubna Taha 
Best Text: My Mom Loves Fattoosh by Eva Kosma and illustrated by Azza Hussein
Best Illustration: The Pomegranate Girl by Rania Zbib Daher and illustrated by Joelle Achkar
Best Production: Clever Walker by Nabiha Mheidly and illustrated by Hassan Zahreddine

2015
Best Children's Book of the Year: The Judge's Mule by Shafeek Mehdi and illustrated by Taiba Abdullah
Best Young Adult Book of the Year: Getting out of the Bubble by Ibrahim Shalabi
Best Text: Me and My Granny written and illustrated by Ebtihaj Al Harthi
Best Illustration: Nour Runs Away from the Story written by Abeer Ali Al Kalbani and illustrated by Gulnar Hajo
Best Production: The Judge's Mule by Shafeek Mehdi and illustrated by Taiba Abdullah

2016
Best Children's Book of the Year: Excuse Me, Give Me Away by Nabiha Mheidli
Best Young Adult Book of the Year: Screams Behind Doors by Rania Hussien Amin
Best Text: I Want to Be a Turtle by Amal Farah
Best Illustration: The Blue Lake of Questions, written by Maya Abu Al-Hayat
Best Production: Boulqash, authored and illustrated by Yara Bamiya

2018
Best Children's Book of the Year: Homesick (الحنين) written by Aisha al-Harthi and illustrated by Hassan Manasra from Dar al-Alam al-Arabi
Best Young Adult Book of the Year: The Secret of Oil (سر الزيت) written by Walid Daqqa from the Tamer Institute
Best Text: Mama My Classmate (ماما بنت صفي) written by Lubna Taha and illustrated by Maya Fadawi from Al Salwa Books
Best Illustration: Think of Others by Mahmoud Darwish and illustrated by Sahar Abdullah from Tanmia Publishing House
Best Production: Koozy (كوزي) by Anastasia Qarawani and illustrated by Maja Kastelic from Al Salwa Books

See also 
 Emirates Telecommunications Corporation
 Etisalat Prize for Literature

References

External links
Etisalat Award for Arabic Children’s Literature, official website

Award for Arabic Children's Literature
Awards established in 2009
Arabic literary awards
Children's literary awards